Cham Zereshk-e Choqavian Gol Morad (also Romanized as Cham Zereshk-e Choqāvīān Gol Morād; also known as Cham Zereshk-e Choqāvīān) is a village in Dasht-e Hor Rural District, in the Central District of Salas-e Babajani County, Kermanshah Province, Iran. At the 2006 census, its population was 98, in 19 families.

References 

Populated places in Salas-e Babajani County